Web3D was initially the idea to fully display and navigate websites using 3D. By extension, the term now refers to all interactive 3D content that is embedded into web pages' HTML and that users can see through a web browser.

Notable formats and tools include:
 3DMLW
 A-Frame (VR)
 Additive Manufacturing File Format
 Adobe Shockwave
 Blend4Web
 Java 3D
 JOGL
 LWJGL
 O3D
 Oak3D
 PlayCanvas
 ShiVa
 Three.js
 Unity
 Verge3D
 Viewpoint
 Virtools
 VRML
 Web3D Consortium
 WebGL
 WebVR
 WireFusion
 X3D (extension of VRML)
 X3DOM

They are mainly distinguished by five criteria:
 Simplicity (automatic installation, rate facility already high)
 Compatibility (Windows, Mac, Unix, etc.)
 Quality (performance, see frames per second, and indirectly, display quality)
 Interactivity (depending on the solutions and their programming opportunities, content creators have more or less freedom in the creation of interactivity)
 Standardization (none; "market position", by a standards organization, etc.)

See also
 
 List of vector graphics markup languages

3D computer graphics
Virtual reality